Jasper County is a county located in the central portion of the U.S. state of Georgia. As of the 2020 census, the population was 14,588, up from 13,900 in 2010. The county seat is Monticello. Jasper County is part of the Atlanta-Sandy Springs-Roswell, GA Metropolitan Statistical Area.

History
This area was inhabited by indigenous peoples for thousands of years before the arrival of Europeans. At the time of European-American settlement, it was inhabited by the Cherokee and Muscogee Creek peoples, who became known as among the Five Civilized Tribes of the Southeast.

The county was created on December 10, 1807, by an act of the Georgia General Assembly with land that was originally part of Baldwin County, Georgia. It became part of the new area of upland settlement through the South eventually known as the Black Belt, and a center of large plantations for short-staple cotton. Invention of the cotton gin in the late 18th century had made processing of this type of cotton profitable, and it was cultivated throughout the inland areas. As migration continued to the west, the county population rapidly rose and fell through the nineteenth century. Georgia settlers pushed Congress for the Indian Removal Act of 1830, which eventually forced most of the Native Americans west of the Mississippi River.

Jasper County was originally named Randolph County (after the Virginian John Randolph). Because of Randolph's opposition to U.S. entry into the War of 1812, the General Assembly changed the name of Randolph County to Jasper County on December 10, 1812, to honor Sergeant William Jasper, an American Revolutionary War hero from South Carolina. However, Randolph's reputation eventually was restored, and in 1828, the General Assembly created a new Randolph County.

Newton County was created from a part of the original Jasper County in 1821.

The Jasper County, Georgia courthouse was shown and used for filming the courthouse scenes in the motion picture comedy "My Cousin Vinny", starring Joe Pesci. Although the setting of the movie is in Beechum County, Alabama (a fictitious place), near the end of the movie, Sheriff Farley (played by veteran actor Bruce McGill), actually mentions Jasper County, Georgia by name.

Government
The county has a five-member county commission, elected from single-member districts. The commission elects a chairman and vice-chairman to aid in conducting business.
The county is protected by a combined Fire Rescue Department providing EMS and Fire Services. The department operates out of seven fire stations with the majority of their manpower being volunteers. The department employs 50 personnel, which include full-time, part-time, and volunteer employees, and is headed by a Fire Chief Christopher Finch.

Geography

The western portion of Jasper County, west of a line formed by State Route 11 to northwest of Monticello, then along the eastern border of the Piedmont National Wildlife Refuge, is located in the Upper Ocmulgee River sub-basin of the Altamaha River basin.  The eastern portion of the county is located in the Upper Oconee River sub-basin of the same Altamaha River basin.

Major highways
  State Route 11
  State Route 16
  State Route 83
  State Route 142
  State Route 212
  State Route 380

Adjacent counties
 Morgan County - northeast
 Putnam County - east
 Jones County - south
 Monroe County - southwest
 Butts County - west
 Newton County - northwest

National protected areas
 Oconee National Forest (part)
 Piedmont National Wildlife Refuge (part)

Demographics

2000 census
As of the census of 2000, there were 11,426 people, 4,175 households, and 3,122 families living in the county. There were 4,806 housing units at an average density of 13 per square mile (5/km2). The racial makeup of the county was 70.95% White, 27.26% Black or African American, 0.21% Native American, 0.16% Asian, 0.02% Pacific Islander, 0.61% from other races, and 0.79% from two or more races.  2.07% of the population were Hispanic or Latino of any race.

There were 4,175 households, out of which 34.60% had children under the age of 18 living with them, 56.80% were married couples living together, 13.30% had a female householder with no husband present, and 25.20% were non-families. 21.40% of all households were made up of individuals, and 7.70% had someone living alone who was 65 years of age or older.  The average household size was 2.72 and the average family size was 3.14.

In the county, the population was spread out, with 27.20% under the age of 18, 7.90% from 18 to 24, 28.60% from 25 to 44, 24.50% from 45 to 64, and 11.80% who were 65 years of age or older.  The median age was 36 years. For every 100 females, there were 96.20 males.  For every 100 females age 18 and over, there were 93.00 males.

The median income for a household in the county was $39,890, and the median income for a family was $43,271. Males had a median income of $32,351 versus $21,785 for females. The per capita income for the county was $19,249.  About 10.90% of families and 14.20% of the population were below the poverty line, including 19.20% of those under age 18 and 13.50% of those age 65 or over.

2010 census
As of the 2010 United States Census, there were 13,900 people, 5,044 households, and 3,778 families living in the county. The racial makeup of the county was 73.9% white, 21.8% black or African American, 0.4% American Indian, 0.2% Asian, 2.0% from other races, and 1.7% from two or more races. Those of Hispanic or Latino origin made up 3.7% of the population. In terms of ancestry, 14.2% were English, 12.2% were Irish, 11.9% were American, and 6.6% were German.

Of the 5,044 households, 36.2% had children under the age of 18 living with them, 55.7% were married couples living together, 13.8% had a female householder with no husband present, 25.1% were non-families, and 20.8% of all households were made up of individuals. The average household size was 2.74 and the average family size was 3.15. The median age was 39.0 years.

The median income for a household in the county was $42,081 and the median income for a family was $52,177. Males had a median income of $40,323 versus $27,491 for females. The per capita income for the county was $20,263. About 13.2% of families and 19.1% of the population were below the poverty line, including 28.7% of those under age 18 and 18.0% of those age 65 or over.

2020 census

As of the 2020 United States census, there were 14,588 people, 5,171 households, and 3,807 families residing in the county.

Communities
 Hillsboro
 Monticello (county seat)
 Shady Dale

Notable people
 Susan Holmes - American politician born in Jasper County. 2001 Jasper County Citizen of the Year.
 Roy "Buckshot" Jones - NASCAR driver.
 Odell Thurman - NFL player.
 Trisha Yearwood - Country music artist. In 2005, she released a studio album titled Jasper County.

See also

 National Register of Historic Places listings in Jasper County, Georgia 
List of counties in Georgia

References

External links
 Jasper County Sheriff's Office
 Jasper County historical marker
 The Old Loyd Place historical marker

 
Georgia (U.S. state) counties
1807 establishments in Georgia (U.S. state)
Populated places established in 1807
Jasper